Roland Bertranne (born 6 December 1949 in Ibos) is a former French rugby union player. He played as a Centre.

Bertranne played for Stade Bagnérais and Toulon. He earned his first national cap on 27 February 1971 against the England in Twickenham and scored a try on debut. He held the French record for most caps (69) for a long time. He still holds the French record of consecutive caps.
He also played for the Barbarians and for a World XV on 9 August 1980 against  in Buenos Aires, losing 36-22.  Bertranne was the youngest member of the RFU President's Overseas XV squad that played 4 matches as part of the centenary celebrations of the Rugby Football Union in 1971.

Honours 
 Grand Slam : 1977, 1981
 French rugby champion finalist, 1979, 1981 with Stade Bagnérais.

References

External links
sporting-heroes

1949 births
French rugby union players
Living people
France international rugby union players
Rugby union centres
Sportspeople from Hautes-Pyrénées
RC Toulonnais players